Zumpango del Río  is the capital of Eduardo Neri Municipality, within the state of Guerrero, in central−western Mexico.

The Spanish discovered silver lodes here in 1531, and started commercial silver mining in the area.  Francisco de Hoyos and Juan Juan Jaramillo made the discovery when returning from a military expedition to Guerrero.  Using Indian slave labor until the ban from doing so was enforced in 1550, the mines produced 1000 pounds of silver by 1539.  Prominent mine owners included Juan de Burgos and Hernán Cortés.  Most of the mines were abandoned by 1582 however.

Geography

Climate

See also

References

Populated places in Guerrero
Municipality seats in Guerrero
Sierra Madre del Sur